Ellingsrud Church is a church center in Oslo, Norway.  Ellingsrud Church was consecrated in 1981.  The church was built according to drawings by architect Erik Anker.

The altarpiece is painted by Ingjerd Pettersen-Hagh. The altarpiece is divided into three parts, and has a painting depicting the women at the grave of Christ, the risen Christ and Christ washing the disciples' feet.

The church organ has 17 voices, made by Ryde & Berg in 1994.

The church bells in a separate bell tower from Olsen Nauen Bell Foundry were made in 1981. There are 12 bells in the carillon, of which the two largest are also used for regular ringing.

In the building is also a parish hall and the church's offices. In the basement of the church is the "Culture Cellar", an exhibition and sale for local artists and craftsmen.

References

External links 
 Official parish website (in Norwegian)

Lutheran churches in Oslo
Churches completed in 1981
1981 establishments in Norway
20th-century Church of Norway church buildings